Abacetus poeciloides is a species of ground beetle, in the subfamily Pterostichinae. It was described by Straneo in 1949.

References

poeciloides
Beetles described in 1949